Bellenaves is a commune in the Allier department in central France.

Geography
The river Bouble forms part of the commune's northeastern border.

Population
Inhabitants are called Bellenavois and Bellenavoises.

Administration 
The current mayor is Nicole Hauchart, elected in 2020.

See also
Communes of the Allier department

References

Communes of Allier
Allier communes articles needing translation from French Wikipedia